William Venoid Banks (May 6, 1903 – August 24, 1985) was an American lawyer and minister who is the first President and General Manager of WGPR-FM (which became Detroit's first black radio station) and WGPR-TV (which was the first black-owned and black-operated television station in the United States).

Banks was born in Geneva, Kentucky, and graduated from Lincoln Institute of Kentucky. He earned degrees from what is now Wayne State University and from the Detroit College of Law.

He also attended the Detroit Baptist Seminary and was ordained a minister in 1949. He was also the founder of the bogus organization called International Free and Accepted Modern Masons. William V. Banks claimed to have become a freemason in 1925 at a lodge named St. John Masonic Lodge in Geneva, Kentucky. However, he was never able to show proof that this lodge ever existed or if it did exist, when it ceased to exist. Furthermore, Banks was never able to establish a legitimate masonic lineage for himself or the organization he founded.

References

American radio executives
1903 births
1985 deaths